Rice City Matriculation Higher Secondary School is a school in Aduthurai with 2800 students and 100 teachers. It is situated near Aduthurai railway station.

External links
http://www.ricecityschool.com

High schools and secondary schools in Tamil Nadu
Education in Thanjavur district